Penn Run is an unincorporated community in Indiana County, Pennsylvania, United States. Penn Run has a post office with ZIP code 15765, which opened on June 13, 1839.

References

Unincorporated communities in Indiana County, Pennsylvania
Unincorporated communities in Pennsylvania